Walburga "Wally" Neuzil (19 August 1894 – 25 December 1917) was an Austrian nurse who was the lover and muse of the artist Egon Schiele between 1911 and 1915.

Early life 
Neuzil was born in Tattendorf, Lower Austria in 1894, the second child of Thekla Pfneisl, a day labourer, and Josef Neuzil, an elementary school teacher. Thekla and Josef married in March 1895, and had three more daughters (Berta, Antonia and Mari) before Josef's death in 1902 (1905 in some sources). In 1906, Thekla and her five daughters (Wally had an older sister named Anna) relocated to Vienna, some 30 kilometres to the north of Tattendorf.

In contemporary records, Neuzil is registered variously as a sales assistant, cashier, or storefront model. By the age of 16 she was sitting as a model for Gustav Klimt, and was rumored to have been his lover, though no documentary evidence of this has come to light. Art modeling and prostitution were closely associated in Vienna at this time, providing fertile ground for rumor.

Relationship with Egon Schiele 

Neuzil met the Austrian artist Egon Schiele in 1911; she was 17 and he was 21. The circumstances under which they met are unknown, although it has been suggested that they were introduced by Klimt, of whom Schiele was a protégé and Neuzil was a model. They became lovers, and Neuzil soon moved into Schiele's Vienna home, and over the next four years modelled regularly for his paintings; they were also lovers for much of this period. Neuzil featured in several of Schiele's most well-known paintings, including Portrait of Wally (1912), Wally Neuzil in Black Stockings (1912), and Wally in Red Blouse with Raised Knees (1913). 

After struggling to fit into Viennese society, Neuzil and Schiele moved to her mother's hometown of Krumau (now Český Krumlov) in Bohemia. However, their lifestyle choices, including their unmarried status and Schiele's alleged employment of local girls as models, led to criticism from locals and the couple soon moving to Neulengbach, near Vienna, in 1912. There, Schiele was dogged by similar rumours, and was arrested for seducing a twelve-year-old girl; while this charge was dropped, Schiele was charged with exhibiting erotic art in a place accessible to children. During his time in prison, Schiele wrote how Neuzil was the only one of his friends and acquaintances who continued to offer him support. 

In 1914, Schiele set up a studio in Hietzing in Vienna's suburbs, where he first met the sisters Edith and Adéle Harms. Around this time, Schiele wrote in a letter to Arthur Roessler that he was "planning to marry, advantageously, not Wally" ("habe vor zu heiraten, günstigst, nicht Wally"). In 1915, Schiele became engaged to Edith, and informed Neuzil of his intentions at the Café Eichberger. Evidence at the time suggested Schiele intended to carry on some relationship with Neuzil despite his marriage; a letter he wrote to Neuzil mentioned them continuing to holiday together without Edith. However, Neuzil ended the relationship immediately after Schiele announced his engagement, and the two did not see each other again, although a letter by an acquaintance of both Neuzil and Schiele suggested he continued to offer her some financial support as late as 1915. After Neuzil's departure, Schiele painted Death and the Maiden in response to the end of their relationship.

Later life 

Following the end of her relationship with Schiele, Neuzil trained as a nurse and found employment in a military hospital in Vienna. By 1917, she was working in Sinj in Dalmatia, where she died of scarlet fever on 25 December 1917 at the age of 23.

Legacy 
Schiele died in 1918 during the Spanish flu pandemic, three days after the death of his wife Edith and their unborn child.

Portrait of Wally is currently on display at the Leopold Museum in Vienna. It was subject to a protracted legal battle in 1998 following its display on loan in the USA after The New York Times reported that the painting had been improperly acquired by the museum via Nazi looting of Jewish-owned art during the Holocaust. In 2010, the Leopold Museum reached a $19 million settlement with the family of Lea Bondi Jaray, an art dealer who had originally owned the painting before being forced to sell it and flee Austria in 1939 following the Anschluss and subsequent Aryanisation of Austria.

In 2017, Neuzil's grave was located in Sinj. In Neuzil's hometown of Tattendorf, a square is named after her.

In 1980, Excess and Punishment, a biographical film about Schiele, was released. In it, Neuzil was portrayed by Jane Birkin.

References

1894 births
1917 deaths
Deaths from streptococcus infection
Austrian nurses
People from Lower Austria
Muses